Shahr-e No ("New City") was the red light district located in Gomrok town of Tehran, Iran. It employed about 1,500 women.

After the Iranian revolution and the establishment of Islamic regime under Ayatollah Khomeini, in 1980 the government demolished the red light district. Hooman Majd, author of The Ayatollah Begs to Differ, said that the Iranian government did this for Islamic reasons and to demonstrate the government's authority. The area was flattened and converted into a park and hospital. The women of Shahr-e No are featured in the photographic series The Citadel by Kaveh Golestan.

References

Neighbourhoods in Tehran
Red-light districts in Iran